The Vancouver Stealth are a lacrosse team based in Vancouver, British Columbia. The team plays in the National Lacrosse League (NLL). The 2016 season was the 17th in franchise history and the third season in Vancouver. The franchise previously played in Everett, Washington, San Jose, and Albany, New York.

Regular season

Final standings

Game log

Roster

Transactions

Trades

Entry Draft
The 2015 NLL Entry Draft took place on September 28, 2015. The Stealth made the following selections:

See also
2016 NLL season

References

Vancouver
Vancouver Stealth seasons
Vancouver Stealth